Dolno Konjari is a village in the municipality of Petrovec, North Macedonia.

Demographics
According to the 2002 census, the village had a total of 704 inhabitants. Ethnic groups in the village include:
Bosniaks 598
Albanians 121
Macedonians 7
Turks 6
Others 2

Sports
The local football club FK Dolno Konjari plays in the OFS Gazi Baba.

References

External links

Villages in Petrovec Municipality
Albanian communities in North Macedonia